Don Westbrook (born November 1, 1952) is a former wide receiver for the New England Patriots of the National Football League.

He played his college football at Nebraska.  He was a member of the undefeated 1971 squad that won the National Championship.

1952 births
Living people
Sportspeople from Cheyenne, Wyoming
Players of American football from Wyoming
Cheyenne Central High School alumni
American football wide receivers
Nebraska Cornhuskers football players
New England Patriots players